Jan Patrik de Laval (28 March 1948 – 19 December 2019) was a Swedish actor and director. He was born in Västrum.

Filmography
1968 – Alkestis
1969 – Den girige
1969 – Kameleonterna
1979 – Selambs (TV-series)
1979 – Mor gifter sig (TV-series)
1987 – Komedianter
1996 – Skilda världar (TV-series)
1997 – Rederiet (TV-series)

References

External links 

20th-century Swedish male actors
1948 births
2019 deaths
Place of death missing